Yasin Dorzadeh (Arabic:ياسين درزاده) (born 29 June 1996) is a Qatari footballer who plays as a defender for Al-Shamal.

Career

Al-Gharafa
Yasin Yaqoub started his career at Al-Gharafa and is a product of the Al-Gharafa's youth system.

Al-Markhiya
On 2016 left Al-Gharafa and signed with Al-Markhiya.

Al-Arabi
On 31 October 2017, he left Al-Markhiya and signed with Al-Arabi. On 19 November 2017, Yasin Yaqoub made his professional debut for Al-Arabi against Al-Rayyan in the Pro League, replacing Tariq Hamed.

Al-Shamal
On 8 September 2020, he left Al-Arabi and signed with Al-Shamal.

References

External links
 

1996 births
Living people
Qatari footballers
Al-Gharafa SC players
Al-Markhiya SC players
Al-Arabi SC (Qatar) players
Al-Shamal SC players
Qatar Stars League players
Qatari Second Division players
Association football midfielders
Place of birth missing (living people)